The discography of Behemoth, a Polish extreme metal band, consists of twelve studio albums, four live albums, two compilation albums, ten extended plays, three video albums, twenty-seven music videos, four demo albums, and one split album.

Formed by Nergal during mid-1991, Behemoth released their first record a year later with the rehearsal tape Endless Damnation, followed by the 1993 demos The Return of the Northern Moon, and …From the Pagan Vastlands. Later that year, Behemoth signed with the Italian independent record label Entropy and released the EP And the Forests Dream Eternally in 1994, followed by the debut full-length, 1995's Sventevith (Storming Near the Baltic). Behemoth signed a deal with Solistitium Records and released their second studio album, Grom in 1996. The third album, titled Pandemonic Incantations was released in 1998, the first with drummer Inferno. Later that year the group signed a record deal with label Avantgarde Music. The first album released was Satanica in 1999, followed by 2000's Thelema.6, and Zos Kia Cultus (Here and Beyond), issued in 2002. Behemoth signed a deal with Swedish label Regain Records in 2003, and later that year two members joined the band: bassist Orion, along with session guitarist Seth. With this new line-up they released Demigod in 2004, followed by 2007's The Apostasy, the first ever Behemoth album that did chart. It peaked at number 149 on the US Billboard.

Albums

Studio albums

Live albums

Compilation albums

Split albums

Extended plays

Demo albums

Videography

Video albums

Music videos

Other appearances

Bibliography

References

External links
 Behemoth
 

Heavy metal group discographies
Discographies of Polish artists
Discography